Swiftia is a genus of gorgonian-type octocorals in the family Plexauridae.

Species
The World Register of Marine Species lists the following species:

References

Plexauridae
Octocorallia genera